Mary Immaculate, Refuge of Sinners is a Roman Catholic church in Rathmines, Dublin built in 1854 in the "Greek style". The church was originally designed by Patrick Byrne and later extended by William Henry Byrne who added a portico and pediment.

The church was destroyed in January 1920 by a fire but was rebuilt and reopened by 1922.

Trivia 

It is mentioned as "Rathmines' blue dome" in Ulysses.

Two characters in Sally Rooney's 2021 novel Beautiful World, Where Are You attend Mass in the church.

References

External links
 rathminesparish.ie

Rathmines
Churches of the Roman Catholic Archdiocese of Dublin
Neoclassical church buildings in Ireland